Cristian Andreoni (born 30 May 1992) is an Italian football player. He plays for  club Pordenone.

Club career
After starting his senior career in Serie D, he made his professional debut in the Serie C on 1 September 2013 for Pro Patria in a game against Cremonese.

On 31 January 2019, he signed a 1.5-year contract with Serie B club Ascoli.

He made his Serie B debut for Ascoli on 16 March 2019 in a game against Verona, as a 90th-minute substitute for Lorenzo Laverone.

On 3 September 2020 he joined Serie C side Bari, signing a 3-year contract. On 31 January 2022, Andreoni moved to Serie B club Pordenone on loan. On 11 July 2022, he returned to Pordenone (by then relegated to Serie C) on a permanent basis with a two-year contract.

References

External links
 

1992 births
People from Vaprio d'Adda
Footballers from Lombardy
Living people
Italian footballers
Association football defenders
A.C. Ponte San Pietro Isola S.S.D. players
Aurora Pro Patria 1919 players
A.C. Reggiana 1919 players
FC Lugano players
Bassano Virtus 55 S.T. players
L.R. Vicenza players
Ascoli Calcio 1898 F.C. players
S.S.C. Bari players
Pordenone Calcio players
Serie B players
Serie C players
Serie D players
Italian expatriate footballers
Expatriate footballers in Switzerland
Sportspeople from the Metropolitan City of Milan